Andrew David Horowitz (born October 12, 1983) is an American musician, songwriter, producer and recording artist. He is best known as the green-tied keyboardist and co-writer for the indie rock band Tally Hall. Horowitz has worked with several artists including John Legend, Lindsey Stirling, Jidenna, Allie X, Verite, Scott Klopfenstein, and Janelle Monae.

Early life 

Horowitz is a native of Warren, New Jersey. He began piano studies at the age of five and was composing by the age of eight. He graduated from the Pingry School in 2001. While in high school, he pursued composition and piano studies with faculty at the Juilliard School. He was the principle pianist in the New York Youth Symphony, led an active jazz quartet, and directed several shows. Over the summers, he attended the Interlochen Arts Festival and Aspen Music Festival.

He attended the University of Michigan in 2001 and received bachelor's degrees in Music Composition and English Literature. He studied composition privately with Susan Botti, Michael Daugherty, Curtis Curtis-Smith, William Bolcom, Evan Chambers and Karen Tanaka. He also attended La Schola Cantorum's counterpoint workshop in Paris.

As a writer, Horowitz won two Hopwood Awards for fiction and poetry. Andrew was also a senior arts writer for The Michigan Daily.

In 2004, Horowitz was the recipient of BMI Foundation's John Lennon Scholarship Award for writing Tally Hall's "Good Day".

Career 

In 2002, Horowitz joined the Michigan-based band named Tally Hall with Rob Cantor, Joe Hawley,
Zubin Sedghi, and Steve Gallagher (who was later replaced by Ross Federman). Horowitz performed as keyboardist, writer and vocalist in the band. He wrote songs including "Good Day", "The Whole World and You", "Misery Fell", and more. He would play with Tally Hall until 2011, after their Good & Evil tour, where the band would then begin an indefinite hiatus.

Since 2011 

Horowitz began apprenticing under producer Dave Tozer in 2011. He spent two years working on John Legend's gold-certified Love in the Future, which includes the 12× platinum "All of Me". He also worked on productions for artists including needtobreathe, Celine Dion, Kai, Rebecca Ferguson, Ella Eyre and Dev.

In 2012, Horowitz released an album on a tape cassette under the pseudonym of edu. He titled the album “Sketches”. The cassette tapes sold out, which would later lead him to post the album to the internet.

On July 1, 2014, he appeared with Rob Cantor in a video titled "29 Celebrity Impressions, 1 Original Song", performing their song "Perfect". A week later, Cantor released a making-of video, demonstrating that his impressions were a hoax done through audio and video editing, and in fact featured 11 different impressionists. , the original video has 18.8 million views, and the corresponding explanation video has 2.6 million views.

In July 2019, he would release a more refined and updated version of sketches to streaming services. He titled this album “Sketches 3D", again under the edu name.

As a writer and producer, Horowitz has become a presence in the NY music scene. He's worked with LP, Kara Dioguardi, Amanda Brown, Gala, Morgxn, Phebe Starr, Carrie Manolakos, Janelle Kroll, Kat Cunning, Crystal Monee Hall, and Sash, among others.

Horowitz was starred as a guest on DaChimkenPeoples podcast interview; the files were corrupted and lost.

He currently works out of his studio in Williamsburg, Brooklyn.

Discography

With Tally Hall
 Complete Demos (2004)
 Marvin's Marvelous Mechanical Museum (2005)
 Good & Evil (2011)
 Admittedly Incomplete Demos (2015)

As edu
 sketches (2012)
 sketches 3d (2019)

Self-titled
 etudes (2018)
 etudes ii (2019)

Selected credits

References

1983 births
Living people
Singer-songwriters from New Jersey
American male singer-songwriters
University of Michigan School of Music, Theatre & Dance alumni
People from Warren Township, New Jersey
Pingry School alumni
21st-century American singers
21st-century American male singers
The Michigan Daily alumni